Wayne County is a county in the U.S. state of Ohio. As of the 2020 census, the population was 116,894. Its county seat is Wooster. The county is named for General "Mad" Anthony Wayne. Wayne County comprises the Wooster, OH Micropolitan Statistical Area.

History
Wayne County as it exists today was described in legislation in 1808 but was not formally organized until January 1812, with effect from March 1. An earlier Wayne County, created by the government of the Northwest Territory in 1796, included much of northern Ohio and all of the lower peninsula of Michigan. That Wayne County is now part of Michigan.

Geography

Adjacent counties
 Medina County (north)
 Summit County (northeast)
 Stark County (east)
 Holmes County (south)
 Ashland County (west)

Demographics

2000 census
As of the census of 2000, there were 111,564 people, 40,445 households, and 29,484 families living in the county. The population density was 201 people per square mile (78/km2). There were 42,324 housing units at an average density of 76 per square mile (29/km2). The racial makeup of the county was 96.52% White, 1.57% Black or African American, 0.16% Native American, 0.66% Asian, 0.01% Pacific Islander, 0.24% from other races, and 0.84% from two or more races. 0.75% of the population were Hispanic or Latino of any race. 31.7% were of German, 13.9% American, 9.6% Irish, 9.0% English and 5.5% Swiss ancestry according to Census 2000. 91.5% spoke English, 3.2% German, 1.6% Dutch, 1.5% Pennsylvania Dutch and 1.2% Spanish as their first language.

There were 40,445 households, out of which 35.00% had children under the age of 18 living with them, 60.80% were married couples living together, 8.70% had a female householder with no husband present, and 27.10% were non-families. 22.70% of all households were made up of individuals, and 8.70% had someone living alone who was 65 years of age or older. The average household size was 2.68 and the average family size was 3.17.

In the county, the population was spread out, with 27.40% under the age of 18, 9.80% from 18 to 24, 27.80% from 25 to 44, 22.70% from 45 to 64, and 12.20% who were 65 years of age or older. The median age was 35 years. For every 100 females there were 97.50 males. For every 100 females age 18 and over, there were 94.50 males.

The median income for a household in the county was $41,538, and the median income for a family was $48,294. Males had a median income of $33,976 versus $23,203 for females. The per capita income for the county was $18,330. About 5.40% of families and 8.00% of the population were below the poverty line, including 10.60% of those under age 18 and 6.90% of those age 65 or over.

2010 census
As of the 2010 United States Census, there were 114,520 people, 42,638 households, and 30,070 families living in the county. The racial makeup of the county was 95.7% white, 1.5% black or African American, 0.8% Asian, 0.2% American Indian, 0.5% from other races, and 1.4% from two or more races. Those of Hispanic or Latino origin made up 1.6% of the population. In terms of ancestry, 34.1% were German, 13.3% were American, 12.9% were Irish, and 9.0% were English.

Of the 42,638 households, 32.5% had children under the age of 18 living with them, 57.1% were married couples living together, 9.2% had a female householder with no husband present, 29.5% were non-families, and 25.1% of all households were made up of individuals. The average household size was 2.61 and the average family size was 3.13. The median age was 38.3 years.

The median income for a household in the county was $48,375 and the median income for a family was $59,692. Males had a median income of $42,082 versus $29,623 for females. The per capita income for the county was $22,645. About 7.8% of families and 9.9% of the population were below the poverty line, including 14.9% of those under age 18 and 6.3% of those age 65 or over.

Ancestry
There were several large waves of migration into what it is today Wayne County, Ohio.  The first wave was groups of families from New England, migrating westward into what was then the Northwest Territory and then early statehood era Ohio between the 1790s and the 1820s.  Most of the settlers who arrived in what would become Wayne County at that time were from New England.  They were overwhelmingly Congregationalists, however, in the 1810s several arrived who had become Methodists, Baptists and Presbyterians during the Second Great Awakening.  These groups were of English ancestry, being descended from the English Puritans who arrived in colonial New England during the 1620s and 1630s.  The English-descended "Yankee" New Englanders established the county in 1812. The second large migration was German immigrants, the Germans settled in Wayne County in large numbers between the 1820s and the 1880s, forming a steady stream of migration into the county during that time.  These immigrants were almost exclusively Lutheran. Lastly in the early 1850s a large group of Irish immigrants arrived in the county as part of a large wave of migration entering the United States at that time. This group was overwhelmingly Catholic. Many families currently in Wayne County go back to the early 19th century settlement of the county by New Englanders. Today, many of these same people who cite that they are of "American" ancestry are actually of English descent, however, they have families that have been in the state so long, in many cases since the colonial period, that they choose to identify simply as having "American" ancestry or do not, in fact, know their own ancestry. Their ancestry primarily goes back to the original Thirteen Colonies and for this reason many of them today simply claim "American" ancestry, though they are of predominantly English ancestry.  There are also many Irish-Americans in the county.  German-Americans have formed the largest single group in Wayne County since the late 1800s.

Politics
Prior to 1912, Wayne County was a Democratic stronghold in presidential elections, only voting Republicans twice since 1856. It was a bellwether from 1912 to 1936, but starting with the 1940 election, the county has become a Republican stronghold with Lyndon B. Johnson in 1964 being the last Democrat to win the county.

|}

Government

The Wayne County Public Library serves the communities of Wayne County, Ohio from its administrative offices in Wooster, Ohio and branches in Creston, Dalton, Doylestown, Rittman, Shreve, and West Salem. It also offers bookmobile service and outreach program, and patron can use the extended services of CLEVNET, a group of libraries located in northeast Ohio.

In 2005, the library loaned more than 1.2 million items to its 54,000 cardholders. Total holding are over 340,000 volumes with over 900 periodical subscriptions.

Education

 Central Christian High School
 Chippewa High School
 Dalton High School
 Kingsway Christian School
 Northwestern High School
 Norwayne High School
 Orrville High School
 Rittman High School
 Smithville High School
 Triway High School
 Waynedale High School
 Wooster High School

Communities

Cities
 Orrville
 Rittman
 Wooster (county seat)
 Norton (mostly in Summit County)

Villages

 Apple Creek
 Burbank
 Congress
 Creston
 Dalton
 Doylestown
 Fredericksburg
 Marshallville
 Mount Eaton
 Shreve
 Smithville
 West Salem

Townships

 Baughman
 Canaan
 Chester
 Chippewa
 Clinton
 Congress
 East Union
 Franklin
 Green
 Milton
 Paint
 Plain
 Salt Creek
 Sugar Creek
 Wayne
 Wooster

Census-designated places
 Kidron
 New Pittsburg
 Sterling

Unincorporated communities

 Blachleyville
 Burton City
 Cedar Valley
 Centerville
 Devil Town
 East Union
 Easton
 Funk 
 Golden Corners
 Honeytown
 Jefferson
 Johnsons Corners
 Lattasburg
 Maysville
 Millbrook
 Moreland
 Overton
 Pleasant Home
 Reedsburg
 Springville
 West Lebanon

See also

 Death on a Factory Farm
 National Register of Historic Places listings in Wayne County, Ohio

Footnotes

Further reading
 Benjamin Douglass, History of Wayne County, Ohio, from the Days of the Pioneers and First Settlers to the Present Time. Indianapolis, IN: Robert Douglass, 1878.
 History of Wayne County, Ohio. Indianapolis, IN: B.F. Bowen, 1910.

External links
 County website
 Wayne County Public Library website
 Wayne County Board of Elections website

 
1812 establishments in Ohio
Swiss-American culture in Ohio
Populated places established in 1812